The Koalisyong Pambansa was the coalition formed by the Liberal Party and the PDP–Laban for the 1992 Philippine general election. The coalition was seen to lean left-of-center. It emerged as a coalition between activists and liberals, supporting candidates who explicitly adopted progressive positions.

The coalition nominated Jovito Salonga of the Liberal Party for president, and PDP–Laban founder Aquilino Pimentel Jr. for vice president. It had a 23-person slate for the Senate election, and had common candidates in the House of Representatives elections. The coalition was cash strapped, as both Salonga and Pimentel voted to evict the U.S. bases in the country, a move which was unfavorably seen by the business community. Both Salonga and Pimentel ultimately lost, with Salonga finishing sixth of seven candidates, just behind Imelda Marcos, the former first lady. Wigberto Tañada won the coalition's sole seat in the Senate, and several congressmen and local officials won.

References 

Defunct political party alliances in the Philippines